See also 2011 in birding and ornithology, main events of 2012 and 2013 in birding and ornithology
The year 2012 in birding and ornithology.

Worldwide

New species

See also Bird species new to science described in the 2010s (decade)

Taxonomic developments

Ornithologists

Deaths
 Jeffery Boswall (20 March 1931 – 15 August 2012)

World listing

Asia

Israel
 Israel's 5th European storm petrel (Hydrobates pelagicus) off Ashdod on 28 January
 Israel's 6th great shearwater (Ardenna gravis) off Haifa on 28 January

Kuwait
 Kuwait's second white wagtail (Motacilla alba) at Wafra Farms from 10 – 18 February.

Europe

Denmark
 A black-winged kite (Elanus caeruleus) seen flying from Gilleleje north of Copenhagen towards Sweden on 29 April will be the 4th Danish record if accepted.
 A griffon vulture (Gyps fulvus) at Møllehus, Tønder on the Danish/German border on 14 July will be the 4th Danish record and first for 26 years.

Faroe Islands
 The Faroe Islands first Bonaparte's gull (Chroicocephalus philadelphia) at Sandágerði, Tórshavn on 11 January.

France
 An Oriental turtle dove, (Streptopelia orientalis ssp meena) at Lot-et-Garonne on 6 March; sixth record for France if accepted.

Gibraltar
 A tropical mockingbird (Mimus gilvus) at North Mole, Gibraltar first seen on 14 February. If accepted will be a first for the Western Palearctic. Originally identified as a northern mockingbird

Lithuania
 An adult male bufflehead (Bucephala albeola) at Limeikiai, Panevezys on 26 April, will be the first for Lithuania if accepted.

Madeira
 Madeira's first American coot (Fulica americana) at Lugar de Baixo on 21 January.

Netherlands
 An adult black-winged kite (Elanus caeruleus) at Muiden, Zuidpolder on 29 April will be the 7th record for the Netherlands if accepted.

Sweden
 A griffon vulture (Gyps fulvus) just to the south of Gothenburg is the third for Sweden and the first since 2000 if accepted.
 Sweden's third dusky thrush (Turdus eunomus) at Nyköping, Södermanland on 14 January.

United Kingdom
 July – only the second brood of spoon-billed sandpiper (Calidris pygmaea) have hatched in captivity at the Wildfowl & Wetlands Trust's Slimbridge Wetland Centre as part of a breeding scheme to save the critically endangered species from extinction.

North America

United States
 A pair of endangered short-tailed albatross (Phoebastria albatrus) have produced one chick on Midway Atoll for the second year running.

References

External links
 Spoon-billed Sandpiper on BirdLife 

2012
Bird
Birding and ornithology by year